Domkirke means 'Cathedral' in Danish and Norwegian and may refer to:

List of cathedrals in Norway
particularly Oslo Cathedral, Norway
List of cathedrals in Denmark
particularly Roskilde Cathedral, Denmark

Other uses
 Dømkirke, a 2008 album by Sunn O))) recorded at Bergen Cathedral